Grevillea murex is a species of flowering plant in the family Proteaceae and is endemic to a relatively small area of south-western Western Australia. It is a spreading, much-branched shrub with hand-shaped leaves and clusters of greenish-white to dull cream-coloured flowers.

Description
The edges of the leaves are rolled under, enclosing most of the lower surface.

TaxonomyGrevillea murex was first formally described in 1986 by Donald McGillivray in his book New Names in Grevillea (Proteaceae) from specimens collected by Bob Coveny and Bruce Maslin south-west of Three Springs in 1976. The specific epithet (murex) means "a shellfish covered with projections" referring to the fruit.

Distribution and habitat
This grevillea is only known from the Morawa area in the Avon Wheatbelt bioregion of south-western Western Australia, where it grows in woodland and shrubland.

Conservation statusGrevillea murex'' is listed as "Threatened" by the Western Australian Government Department of Biodiversity, Conservation and Attractions, meaning that it is in danger of extinction.

See also
 List of Grevillea species

References

murex
Proteales of Australia
Eudicots of Western Australia
Taxa named by Donald McGillivray
Plants described in 1986